Midship Glacier is a broad flat glacier filling the bulk of Alatna Valley and having its origin on the slopes of Mount Morrison to the south, in the Convoy Range, Victoria Land, Antarctica. From 1957 this ice body was considered part of Benson Glacier, however, it was determined by a 1989–90 New Zealand Antarctic Research Programme field party (led by Trevor Chinn) that although it abuts against the main Benson Glacier at Jetsam Moraine, this glacier makes no contribution of ice to the Benson as its dominant ice flow is northward across its length. With the identification of Midship Glacier as a distinct feature, the application of Benson Glacier has been restricted to the ice flowing eastward from Flight Deck Névé to the terminus in Granite Harbour. The name was approved by the Advisory Committee on Antarctic Names in 1993 as recommended by the New Zealand Geographic Board.

References

Glaciers of Victoria Land
Scott Coast